Jack Katz (born c. 1941) is an American businessman and the founder and chief executive officer of the Panama Jack Company.

Katz attended the University of Florida in Gainesville, Florida, where he was a lineman for coach Ray Graves' Florida Gators football team from 1962 to 1964.  He was a starting defensive lineman for the Gators, and was one of the heroes of the Gators' 10–6 upset of the Alabama Crimson Tide in Tuscaloosa in 1963.  Katz was a third-team All-Southeastern Conference (SEC) selection in 1963.  He was also President of Sigma Nu Fraternity (Epsilon Zeta Chapter) at Florida.

Katz graduated from the University of Florida with a bachelor's degree in education in 1965, and was inducted into the University of Florida Athletic Hall of Fame as a "Distinguished Letter Winner" in 2008.

In 1974, Katz founded the Panama Jack Company, an international purveyor of suncare, beachwear and tropical lifestyle products.

See also 

 Florida Gators
 Florida Gators football, 1960–69
 List of Sigma Nu brothers
 List of University of Florida alumni
 List of University of Florida Athletic Hall of Fame members

References

Bibliography 

 Carlson, Norm, University of Florida Football Vault: The History of the Florida Gators, Whitman Publishing, LLC, Atlanta, Georgia (2007).  .
 Golenbock, Peter, Go Gators!  An Oral History of Florida's Pursuit of Gridiron Glory, Legends Publishing, LLC, St. Petersburg, Florida (2002).  .
 Hairston, Jack, Tales from the Gator Swamp: A Collection of the Greatest Gator Stories Ever Told, Sports Publishing, LLC, Champaign, Illinois (2002).  .
 McCarthy, Kevin M.,  Fightin' Gators: A History of University of Florida Football, Arcadia Publishing, Mount Pleasant, South Carolina (2000).  .
 McEwen, Tom, The Gators: A Story of Florida Football, The Strode Publishers, Huntsville, Alabama (1974).  .
 Nash, Noel, ed., The Gainesville Sun Presents The Greatest Moments in Florida Gators Football, Sports Publishing, Inc., Champaign, Illinois (1998).  .

External links 
  Panama Jack – Official website of the Panama Jack Company.

1940s births
Living people
American football defensive tackles
Businesspeople from Florida
Florida Gators football players